Millbrook is a ghost town in Graham County, Kansas, United States.

History
Graham County was organized for administrative purposes on April 1, 1880, with 1500 inhabitants in the county and with the first county seat located at Millbrook. The appointed officers were: Clerk, E. P. McCabe; commissioners, E. C. Moses and O. G. Nevins. The first election was held on June 1.

Millbrook was destroyed by a tornado on August 4, 1887.

After the tornado
The county seat was moved to Hill City on March 10, 1888.  J.R. Pomeroy, who assisted Mr. Hill in developing Hill City, donated most of the tract of land on which the courthouse was built. This site is still being used for a modern courthouse.

Hill City was chosen as the permanent county seat, and the following officers were elected: Representative, J. L. Walton; commissioners, A. Morton, G. W. Morehouse and J. N. Glover; county clerk, John Deprad; county attorney, J. R. McCowen; register of deeds, H. J. Harrvi; treasurer, L. Thoman; surveyor, L. Pritchard; sheriff, E. A. Moses; coroner, Dr. Butterfield; probate judge, James Gordon.

The post office in Millbrook was established December 5, 1878 and was discontinued August 31, 1889.

Today
The ruins of the limestone schoolhouse still mark the site of where Millbrook once stood, southwest of Hill City.

References

Further reading

External links
 Graham County maps: Current, Historic, KDOT

Former populated places in Graham County, Kansas
Former populated places in Kansas